The Volcom Fiji Pro 2014 was an event of the Association of Surfing Professionals for 2014 ASP World Tour.

This event was held from 1 to 13 June and contested by 36 surfers.

The tournament was won by Gabriel Medina (BRA), who beat Nat Young (US) in final.

Round 1

Round 2

Round 3

Round 4

Round 5

Quarter-finals

Semi-finals

Final

References
 Site ASP

Fiji Pro 2014
2014 in surfing
2014 in Fijian sport
Surfing in Fiji